"On My Knees" is a song by Australian alternative dance group Rüfüs Du Sol, released on 24 September 2021 as the third single from their fourth studio album, Surrender. In a statement James Hunt said "For this song we had a lot of fun writing something that was darker, driving and a little more edgy. It's definitely one of the most banging tracks on the record - we referenced some of our favorite club music for the drum programming and had fun envisioning the time when we could finally play this live. It had an amazing reaction at our Red Rocks shows last month which was really special for us." The song debuted a number 68 on the ARIA Charts.

At the 2022 ARIA Music Awards, the song as nominated for Best Pop Release, and Song of the Year.

Critical reception
Oliver Tyron from Cultr called the song "amazing" saying "[it] is a brooding insight into Rüfüs Du Sol's darker tendencies, toying with honest emotions and aching lyricism, demonstrating what makes them so unique in the electronic space."

Commercial performance
In Australia, "On My Knees" debuted at number 68 on the ARIA Top 100 Singles Chart for the chart dated 4 October 2021. The song rose one place the following week. Following the release of Surrender, "On My Knees" ascended  from number 80 to number 43 on the chart dated 1 November, a rise of 37 places. On 31 January 2022, the song re-entered the chart at a new peak of number 22, following its placing at number 9 in Australian youth broadcaster Triple J's Hottest 100 of 2021.

Track listings

Charts

Weekly charts

Year-end charts

Release history

References

2021 singles
2021 songs
Songs written by Jason Evigan
Rüfüs Du Sol songs
Reprise Records singles